The Mitten is a 1967 Soviet animated film directed by Roman Kachanov. The film received international recognition.

Plot summary
The film centers on a girl who wants a dog. She brings home a puppy, but her mother wouldn't let the puppy stay. The girl is upset and goes outside to the playground, where all the other kids are walking their dogs. She starts playing with her mitten, pretending that the mitten is a dog. And the power of her imagination turns her mitten into a puppy, which keeps the mitten's red color and black spots on the back. The puppy starts chasing a cat, which ends up finding shelter on top of the ad board saying "Everyone who has a dog is welcome to take part in the kennel club competition!" The girl takes her puppy to the competition, and it completes the task better than other dogs, but on the way to finish one of the threads of the puppy's knitted coat gets caught by a nail on the wooden barrier, and it loses the competition. The girl takes it home and is about to feed it, when it turns back to a mitten. Mom notices the girl trying to feed a mitten and decides to get her a real puppy.

Creators
Dolls and scenery made — Pavel Gusyov, Oleg Masainov, V. Petrov, M. Chesnokova, G. Gettinger, G. Lyutinsky, A. Maximov, V. Kalashnikova, V. Kuranov, S. Etlis, leadership the Roman Gurov
Film editor — Vera Gokke
Editor — Natalya Abramova
Director — Nathan Bitman

Awards
MKF in Moscow — a silver medal in competition of children's movies, the movie "The Mitten" (1967)
Annecy International Animation Film Festival — the first award, the movie "The Mitten" (1967) 
Gijón International Film Festival — a prize of the city of Gijon "For high art quality of animation", the movie "The Mitten" (1968)
Gijón International Film Festival — the Grand Prix "A gold plate", the movie "The Mitten" (1968)
All-Union Film Festival — the first award, the movie "The Mitten" (1968)

Interesting facts
There is no dialogue in the film.
Leonid Shvartsman based the character of the mother on a very close acquaintance — Tamara Vladimirovna Poletika (the first wife of his friend and animator Lev Milchin).
The bulldog in “The Mitten” is based on the director, Roman Kachanov.

External links

Films directed by Roman Abelevich Kachanov
Soviet animated films
Soyuzmultfilm
1967 films